The Stümpfling is a mountain, 1,506 metres high, in the Bavarian Prealps. The mountain is an easy mountain walk from the Spitzingsee lake or from the Wildbach Hut. The Suttenbahn and Stümpflingbahn lifts run up the mountain to just below the summit.

External links 
 Entry about the mountain tour

One-thousanders of Germany
Mountains of the Alps
Mountains of Bavaria
Bavarian Prealps